Samuel Lauderdale Park (born October 1, 1985) is an American politician and lawyer, who was elected to the Georgia House of Representatives in the 2016 elections. A member of the Democratic Party, he represents the 101st district.

Early life and education
Born and raised in Georgia, Sam Park is the grandson of refugees from the Korean War, and the son of Korean American immigrants. Through the HOPE Scholarship, Park attended Georgia State University where he obtained a B.A. in Political Science and a B.S. in Economics. He went on to earn his J.D. degree from Georgia State University College of Law and his LL.M. from American University Washington College of Law.

Early political career 
During his second year of law school, Park took a Health, Legislation, and Advocacy course where he drafted a bill to provide skilled nursing services to medically-fragile children. This was his first opportunity to work in the Georgia General Assembly. During the 2012 legislative session he met and interned for Stacey Abrams who was minority leader of the Georgia House Democratic Caucus at that time. He served as a legal extern for the Georgia Senate Democratic Caucus during the 2013 legislative session. He then worked as a legal aide for Maryland State Senator Jamie Raskin. He also worked on Jason Carter's 2014 gubernatorial campaign and Jon Ossoff's 2017 campaign.

Georgia House of Representatives 
Park was inspired to run for political office after his mother was diagnosed with terminal cancer and was able to receive treatment through public health insurance, Medicare, and Medicaid. Park won the 101st district with 51.1% of the vote despite his opponent, incumbent Republican Chairwoman Valerie Clark, being favored during the campaign.

Park is the first openly gay man to be elected to the state legislature in Georgia and the first Asian American Democrat ever elected to the Georgia General Assembly. In 2017, Park was appointed to serve as a Deputy Whip of the Georgia House Democratic Caucus.

In 2018, Park was re-elected with 58.81% of the vote, and was selected to serve as the Vice-Chair of the Gwinnett State House Delegation.

National politics
Park was selected as one of seventeen speakers to jointly deliver the keynote address at the 2020 Democratic National Convention. Park was the first Korean-American to be part of a national party convention keynote address, and he, Malcolm Kenyatta, and Robert Garcia were the first openly gay speakers in a keynote slot at a Democratic National Convention.

References

External links
Official Georgia House of Representatives page

1985 births
21st-century American politicians
American politicians of Korean descent
Asian-American people in Georgia (U.S. state) politics
Gay politicians
Georgia (U.S. state) lawyers
Georgia State University College of Law alumni
American LGBT people of Asian descent
LGBT state legislators in Georgia (U.S. state)
Living people
Democratic Party members of the Georgia House of Representatives
Politicians from Atlanta
Washington College of Law alumni